Empire is a town in Fond du Lac County, Wisconsin, United States. The population was 2,620 at the 2000 census.

Geography
According to the United States Census Bureau, the town has a total area of 29.1 square miles (75.5 km), of which, 29.0 square miles (75.2 km) of it is land and 0.1 square miles (0.3 km) of it (0.45%) is water.

Demographics
At the 2000 census there were 2,620 people, 910 households, and 786 families living in the town. The population density was 90.3 people per square mile (34.9/km).  There were 944 housing units at an average density of 32.5 per square mile (12.6/km).  The racial makeup of the town was 98.13% White, 0.27% African American, 0.34% Native American, 0.65% Asian, 0.11% from other races, and 0.50% from two or more races. Hispanic or Latino of any race were 0.99%.

Of the 910 households 40.0% had children under the age of 18 living with them, 79.3% were married couples living together, 4.3% had a female householder with no husband present, and 13.6% were non-families. 11.4% of households were one person and 4.4% were one person aged 65 or older. The average household size was 2.88 and the average family size was 3.12.

The age distribution was 28.7% under the age of 18, 5.6% from 18 to 24, 26.8% from 25 to 44, 28.9% from 45 to 64, and 10.1% 65 or older. The median age was 40 years. For every 100 females, there were 102.5 males. For every 100 females age 18 and over, there were 101.6 males.

The median household income was $67,330 and the median family income  was $70,511. Males had a median income of $42,875 versus $29,300 for females. The per capita income for the town was $27,174. About 0.5% of families and 1.5% of the population were below the poverty line, including 1.9% of those under age 18 and 2.6% of those age 65 or over.

Notable people

 Charles Ruggles Boardman, U.S. National Guard general
 Edward Colman, Wisconsin State Representative
 David Giddings, Wisconsin Territorial legislator, engineer, and businessman
 Elmer E. Haight, Wisconsin State Representative
 James Lafferty, Wisconsin State Representative
 Michael Reilly, U.S. Representative
 Herman Schroeder, Wisconsin State Representative
 William A. Titus, businessman and politician
 Owen A. Wells, U.S. Representative

References

External links
Town of Empire

Towns in Fond du Lac County, Wisconsin
Towns in Wisconsin